The list of ship launches in 1775 includes a chronological list of some ships launched in 1775.


References

1775
Ship launches